AEC Daily is an e-learning platform for architects, engineers, and other construction professionals. AEC Daily works with hundreds of building product manufacturers to offer quality continuing education courses in variety of subjects. AEC Daily Inc. is based in Newmarket, Ontario, Canada and AEC Daily Corporation is based in Buffalo, New York United States.

History 
AEC Daily was founded by Jeff Rice and Stéphane Deschênes in 2001. They are still the owners of the company.

Continuing Education 
Online education courses are the main field of AEC Daily. They provide over 1000 courses for construction professionals, architects, engineers, designers and landscapers. Most courses are free because they are sponsored by building product manufacturers such as Kohler Kitchen and Bath, Makita, and Wine Cellar Innovations.

Building Products/Services 
The Building Products/Services directory is administrated by AEC Daily and comprises several thousand companies. It is subdivided into the main categories Software, Hardware, Support Services, Firms and Associations. With this directory, customers are able to find the building products/services they are looking for.

Associations 

AEC Daily works closely with many different associations to offer only courses that meet the requirements or have been reviewed and approved by them. Some of these associations include:
In the United States: American Institute of Architects, U.S. Green Building Council, Construction Specifications Institute, Society of American Registered Architects.
In Australia: Australian Institute of Landscape Architects, Building Designers Association of Australia.
In Canada: Royal Architectural Institute of Canada.
In Europe: Association of Architects of Milan, Royal Institute of British Architects, Netherlands Architecture Institute.

External links 
 Website

References 

Architectural education
Education companies established in 2001
Companies based in Newmarket, Ontario